Sonic Impact is a 2000 action/thriller directed by Rodney McDonald and starring James Russo, Mel Harris, Michael Harris and Ice-T, with Michael Raynor.

Plot
Jeremy Barrett, a deranged criminal, is caught by FBI agent Nick Halton and transported on a Columbia Airlines Boeing 747 to New York along with some other criminals. Through a stroke of luck, he is able to subdue the escorting Federal agents, led by Agent Taja; free the other criminals; and take over the 747. After killing one of the passengers and the pilot, Barrett demands a ransom and a helicopter at San Diego, where the 747 is being diverted.

When a small explosion is caused by a gun shot striking an oxygen tank, a massive hole is opened in the cockpit, and with the aircraft badly damaged, Barrett threatens to crash the 747 into a populated area unless his demands are met. Halton then decides to get on the 747 while in flight to do something. He is lowered into the cockpit, but things do not go as planned. Unless the agent can do something, the military will be forced to shoot the aircraft down to minimize the toll.

Cast

 James Russo as Agent Nick Halton
 Ice-T as Agent Taja
 Michael Harris as Jeremy Barrett
 Sam Anderson as Alex Holmes
 J. Kenneth Campbell as Pilot Tom Rush
 Mel Harris as Co-Pilot Jennifer Blake
 Michael Harney as Captain Mark Travis
 Dean Norris as Agent McGee
 Brittany Daniel as Rachel
 Billy "Sly" Williams as Sam Hobbs
 Michael Raynor as Agent Allen
 Heath Lourwood as John Strauss
 Justin Lauer as Ben Strauss
 Alice Barrett as Shelly Peterson (credited as Alice Barrett Mitchell)
 Steve Larson as Lester
 Robert Kerbeck as Vince Patrick
 Jack Maxwell as Byron
 Mike White as Rex
 Jordan Wolfe as Flight Attendant
 Aloma Wright as Travel Agent
 Marc Vahanian as Addict

Production
The working title of the project was "Sonic Blast". Stock aerial scenes of the Boeing 747 were taken from Airport 1975 (1975). Airport 1975 had used a Boeing 747-123 freighter (cargo variant) s/n 20390 (registration N9675), leased from American Airlines, but painted in the fictional Columbia Airlines livery that was used in both films.

Reception
At the 2000 WorldFest Houston, Sonic Impact won the Silver Award for Best Independent Theatrical Feature Films - Action/Adventure category.

Notes

External links
 

2000 films
2000 action thriller films
American aviation films
Films about aviation accidents or incidents
Films about aircraft hijackings
American action thriller films
2000s English-language films
Films directed by Rodney McDonald
2000s American films